Robert Arthur “Nasty” Nash (December 16, 1892 – February 1, 1977) was an Irish-American professional American football player who played in the American Professional Football Association (renamed the National Football League in 1922) for the Akron Pros, Buffalo All-Americans, Rochester Jeffersons and the New York Giants. Prior to joining the AFPA, Nash played professionally in the "Ohio League" for the Massillon Tigers. He was considered by sports historians as one of the greatest offensive tackles of his era.

Nash was born in Ireland and raised in Bernardsville, New Jersey, where he played high school football at Bernards High School. Prior to playing professional football, Nash played college football at Cornell University and at Rutgers, where he received All-American honors in 1914. He was inducted into the Rutgers Hall of Fame in 1988.

Professional career
On Sunday, October 10, 1920, Nash is credited with the first fumble recovery for a touchdown in a game featuring two league teams.

On Sunday, October 24, 1920, Nash picked up a blocked punt in the first quarter and ran eight yards for the only score of the day as the Pros defeated the Cleveland Tigers, 7–0.

On Sunday, October 31, 1920, according to Ike Roy Martin; on a punt return Jim Thorpe had instructed Martin to let Nash get by him. Thorpe had wanted to run into Nash, which he did. The collision resulted in them both being knocked out and they were carried off the field.

Nash was also a part of the first APFA player deal, in 1920, when Akron sold Nash to Buffalo for $300 and five percent of the gate receipts during a game between the two clubs. However, since Nash was a part of the Akron Pros during their championship season, he is credited as belonging on their championship team. Nash was also the very first captain of the New York Giants.

References

External links
 1917 All-Pros
 Ivy League Sports
 Scarlet Knights in the Pros
 Pioneer in Pro Football by Jack Cusack
 Bob Nash's obituary

1892 births
1977 deaths
American football ends
American football tackles
Akron Pros players
Bernards High School alumni
Buffalo All-Americans players
Cornell Big Red football players
Massillon Tigers coaches
Massillon Tigers players
New York Giants players
Rochester Jeffersons players
Rutgers Scarlet Knights football players
People from Bernardsville, New Jersey
People from Winsted, Connecticut
Players of American football from New Jersey
Sportspeople from Somerset County, New Jersey
Irish emigrants to the United States (before 1923)